Lazebnik, Lazebník, or LaZebnik is a surname, meaning "barber" in Czech. Notable people with this surname include:
Betty Lazebnik, music composer, winner of two Genie Awards for Reno and the Doc
Claire Scovell LaZebnik, American novelist and nonfiction author, married to Rob
Elizabeth Lazebnik, Latvian Canadian filmmaker
Ken LaZebnik (born 1954), American television writer, brother of Rob and Philip
Leonid Lazebnik (born 1941), Russian physician
Philip LaZebnik (born 1953), American screenwriter and producer, brother of Ken and Rob
Rob LaZebnik (born 1962), American television writer, brother of Ken and Philip, married to Claire
Svetlana Lazebnik (born 1979), Ukrainian-American computer vision researcher
Faye Schulman (née Lazebnik, born 1919), photographer and survivor of the Lenin ghetto